Andrea Rothfuss (born 20 October 1989) is a German para-alpine skier. She has a disability: she was born without a left hand.

Career
She skied at the 2011 IPC Alpine Skiing World Championships.  She was the first skier to finish in the standing women's downhill race and the slalom race.  She was the second skier to finish in the Super Combined.  She was the third skier to finish in the Super G race and the Giant Slalom Race.

References

Other websites
 
 
  

1989 births
Alpine skiers at the 2006 Winter Paralympics
Alpine skiers at the 2010 Winter Paralympics
Alpine skiers at the 2014 Winter Paralympics
Alpine skiers at the 2018 Winter Paralympics
Alpine skiers at the 2022 Winter Paralympics
German female alpine skiers
Living people
Medalists at the 2006 Winter Paralympics
Medalists at the 2010 Winter Paralympics
Medalists at the 2014 Winter Paralympics
Medalists at the 2018 Winter Paralympics
Medalists at the 2022 Winter Paralympics
Paralympic alpine skiers of Germany
Paralympic bronze medalists for Germany
Paralympic gold medalists for Germany
Paralympic silver medalists for Germany
Paralympic medalists in alpine skiing
People from Freudenstadt
Sportspeople from Karlsruhe (region)
21st-century German women